Rabbi Aryeh Leib Baron (March 2, 1912 – October 3, 2011) was a Russian-born Canadian Haredi Jewish rabbi and rosh yeshiva (dean) of Yeshiva Merkaz HaTorah and the rabbi of Beis Medrash Merkaz HaTalmud in Montréal, Canada, as well as the founder of Yeshiva Ahavas Torah Baranovich in Jerusalem.

Early life 
Rabbi Aryeh Leib Baron was born on March 2, 1912, in the town of Horodok in the Minsk Region of Belarus, then part of the Russian Empire, to Reuven Baranovich (his last name, Baron, is a shortened version of "Baranovich"). His Hebrew birthday was on Taanis Esther. In his youth, he studied under Rabbi Avraham Kalmanowitz in Rakov and later at a yeshiva in Stowbtsy, Belarus. As a younger man, he studied in the Baranovich Yeshiva under Rabbi Elchonon Wasserman and Rabbi David Rappoport. Rabbi Wasserman used the notes that he took in shiur (class) to publish his sefer, Kovetz He'aros. He also developed a close relationship with Rabbi Yisroel Yaakov Lubchansky, the mashgiach in Baranovich and ate Shabbos meals at his house for a time. In the early 1930s, Rabbi Baron went to study in the Mir Yeshiva, where he stayed until the outbreak of World War II, when the yeshiva escaped to Vilnius. In 1940, with the aid of Chiune Sugihara, then-Japanese consul to Kaunas, the yeshiva fled from Nazi-occupied Europe to Kobe, in Japan, from where they were transferred to Shanghai, in China. After several years, much of the yeshiva emigrated to the United States, Rabbi Baron included. He then married the daughter of Rabbi Chaim Eliezer Samson, rosh yeshiva of Yeshivas Chofetz Chaim in Baltimore.

Rabbinic career 
In 1948, Rabbi Leib Baron was appointed rosh yeshiva of Yeshiva Merkaz HaTorah in Montréal, replacing Rabbi Eliyahu Simcha Chazzan who had become rosh yeshiva of Torah Vodaath in New York City in 1945. He stayed as rosh yeshiva for 24 years, often sending students to learn in the major yeshivos in the United States. In 1973, he founded Beis Medrash Merkaz HaTalmud which he led until his move to Israel. He also founded Yeshiva Ahavas HaTorah Baranovich in Jerusalem. On October 3, 2011, Rabbi Leib Baron passed away, a few months after his hundredth birthday. He was buried on Har HaMenuchot in Jerusalem.

Notes

References

1912 births
2011 deaths
20th-century Canadian  rabbis
21st-century rabbis in Jerusalem
Burials at Har HaMenuchot
Canadian Haredi rabbis
Haredi rabbis in Israel
Haredi rosh yeshivas
Israeli people of Belarusian-Jewish descent
Israeli people of Russian-Jewish descent
Israeli Rosh yeshivas
Jews from Quebec
Mir Yeshiva alumni
People from Minsk Region
Russian expatriates in China
Russian expatriates in Japan
Russian Haredi rabbis
White Russian emigrants to Canada